The 1992 WAFL season was the 108th season of senior football in Perth, Western Australia. It is most notable for the end of the Claremont dynasty of the previous five seasons, which was pre-season an expected result of losing all but nine of the premiership side to the AFL draft or in two cases retirement. The Tigers, whose guernsey reverted from the gold sash to the CFC monogram, which they wore during their miraculous premiership success in 1964, fell from first with only two losses to avoiding the wooden spoon only by percentage, in the process using fifty-two players in the league team. East Fremantle won their first premiership for seven years after a very disappointing 1991, whilst East Perth, who had been stragglers for the preceding half-decade, made a remarkable rush from fifth position (after being outside the five for most of the season) to narrowly miss their first Grand Final since winning the 1978 premiership.

After Ian Dargie’s drought-breaking Sandover win for Subiaco in 1991, West Perth, despite suffering the rare ignominy of finishing last in all three grades and having their colts lose fifteen matches in succession after winning their first six, ended the second-longest club drought in Sandover history with the Falcons’ first win since Brian Foley in 1959.

Off the field, the WAFL was hit by the unwillingness of financially crippled Perth to accept relocation to Kelmscott as an integral part of its future development plan – indeed there was an aggressive debate during the pre-season about whether Perth or East Perth should have been the team to make this move. The reluctance of West Perth to move to the northwestern suburbs despite incentive payments from the WAFL totalling $390,000 also affected the league, although unlike the Demons West Perth announced mid-season they would move to Joondalup for 1994.

Home-and-away season

Round 1

Round 2

Round 3

Round 4 (Anzac Day weekend)

Round 5

Round 6

Round 7

Round 8

Round 9

Round 10

Round 11

Round 12

Round 13

Round 14

Round 15

Round 16

Round 17

Round 18

Round 19

Round 20

Round 21

Ladder

Finals

Elimination and Qualifying Finals

Semi-finals

Preliminary final

Grand Final

Notes
The only other clubs to finish last in all three grades since 1957 have been Peel Thunder in their inaugural 1997 season and Swan Districts in 1988. No club has won premierships in all three grades in this time span.

References

External links
Official WAFL website
West Australian Football League (WAFL), 1992

West Australian Football League seasons
WAFL